Don Paul (July 23, 1926 – September 7, 2001) was a professional American football defensive back for the Chicago Cardinals (1950–1953) and the Cleveland Browns (1954–1958) in the National Football League. He was selected to four Pro Bowls, one as a member of the Cardinals and three as a member of the Browns.

1926 births
2001 deaths
American football defensive backs
Washington State Cougars football players
Chicago Cardinals players
Cleveland Browns players
Eastern Conference Pro Bowl players
Players of American football from Tacoma, Washington